RBD: La Familia (also known as La Familia RBD) is a Mexican sitcom made by Televisa about the fictional lives of the Mexican musical group RBD. RBD and the producer, Pedro Damián, have stated that this sitcom is fictional and not really based on the real lives of the members of the singers/actors. The characters of the sitcom are not based on the soap opera Rebelde but are similar to the group's members.

Production finished in the first quarter of 2007, and RBD: La Familia debuted on March 14, 2007 on Sky One in Mexico. The show was also transmitted on Univision that same year. RBD: La Familia was announced to be broadcast on Univisions sister channel UniMas beginning July 1, 2015 replacing Rebelde re-runs at 8AM/7C.

The opening song for the sitcom is "The Family". "Quiero Poder", a song written and sung by Dulce Maria in Spanish, is heavily featured in the show, and is also included on the RBD: La Familia compilation album. Christopher Ückermann confirmed the show to be done after one season.

Cast

Primary characters
Alfonso Herrera as Poncho
Anahí as Annie
Christian Chávez as Chris
Christopher Uckermann as Ucker
Dulce María as Dul
Maite Perroni as May

Secondary characters
Arap Bethke as Alvaro
Mariana Ávila as Mimi
Ari Borovoy as Axel
Elvis Carranza as Robert
Ximena Díaz as Fabiola

Facts
The following statements have been announced regarding the series:

Christian Chávez stated in On Air with Ryan Seacrest that he kissed Maite first in the show.
The English theme song for the sitcom is called "The Family" sung by RBD. The song talks about how close the six friends are and how they will always be there for one another. The song was released in the Celestial Fan Edition album.
According to IMDb, RBD: La Familia is the first Mexican TV show shot entirely in High Definition.
The band said they had started recording a second season, but after separating in 2009, no announcements were made.
The first season finale had two alternate endings, both shown on SKY México.
On September 29, there was an RBD special that promoted RBD: La Familia on Univision.
RBD La Familia premiered in the U.S. on October 6 at 7 pm on Univision. It was running every Saturday at 2 pm.
RBD La Familia came out on DVD on December 14 in Mexico and Spain.
RBD La Familia came out on DVD for US Market July 22, 2008.
The show began airing on Kanal A in Slovenia on August 31, 2009, and ended on September 16, 2009. The timeslot for the show was the same as it was for Rebelde, which was Monday through Friday at 18.55 CET (6.55 pm).

Episode list

Music

References

External links
 RBD Official Site
 RBD: La Familia official page
 

2007 Mexican television series debuts
Mexican television sitcoms
2007 Mexican television series endings